Oana Gregory (born Oana Andreea Grigoruț;  January 9, 1996) is a Romanian-American actress. Established in the United States since October 2002, Gregory became internationally known for roles in Disney productions such as Kickin' It, Lab Rats and Crash & Bernstein.

Early years 
Oana Gregory was born to Dumitru and Mariana Grigoruț in Negrești-Oaș, a small town in northwestern Romania. When she was six, her family moved to the United States with the thought of building a better life, especially for Oana and her older brother, Dorel. Oana attended primary school in Chicago.

Career 
In 2006, Gregory participated in a contest organized by International Models & Talent Association, a prestigious professional organization that, annually, in New York City and Los Angeles, organizes competitions with international participation, to discover new talents in acting, music or fashion. Of the 1,000 contestants from English-speaking countries, Gregory won the title of "actress of the year" at preteens and was declared the first runner-up – "model of the year", also at preteens. After this contest, Gregory received 54 bids from different agencies and managers in Hollywood who wanted to represent her.

She landed her first feature film role as the leading "Loosie Goosie" in the 2010 indie Spork, a musical comedy that received three film festival awards, a CineKid Award and a British Film Institute nomination. On the small screen Gregory has recurred on Disney XD's Lab Rats (2012) and Kickin' It (2011) and has lent her voice to the animated television show Olivia (2009), based on a popular children's book series. Oana Gregory stars as Wyatt's popular 16-year-old sister, Amanda Bernstein, in Disney XD's live-action "bro-comedy" Crash & Bernstein (2012), broadcast in 21 countries. For Amanda's role, Gregory was chosen from more than 2,600 contestants participating in the casting.

In 2021, Gregory joined the platform OnlyFans.

Filmography

References

External links
 

People from Satu Mare County
Romanian emigrants to the United States
Romanian child actresses
Living people
1996 births